The Roman Catholic Diocese of Itanagar (Dioecesis Itanagarensis) in India was created on 7 December 2005 by splitting it from the Diocese of Tezpur. It is a suffragan diocese of the Archdiocese of Guwahati. Its first bishop was John Thomas Kattrukudiyil. The St. Joseph's church in Itanagar is the cathedral of the diocese.

The diocese covers 10 districts of the state of Arunachal Pradesh - Tawang, West Kameng, East Kameng, Papum Pare, Upper Subansiri, Lower Subansiri, Kurung Kamay, West Siang, East Siang and Upper Siang. Neighboring dioceses are the Diocese of Tezpur to the south, the Diocese of Miao to the east. To the west is Bhutan, to the north China.

The diocese covers an area of 52,288 km². As of 2020, 83,822 in the area are member of the Catholic Church. The diocese is subdivided into 42 parishes.

External links
GCatholic.org
Catholic-hierarchy.org
Vatican press release on the creation 

Roman Catholic dioceses in India
Christianity in Arunachal Pradesh
Itanagar
Christian organizations established in 2005
Roman Catholic dioceses and prelatures established in the 21st century
2005 establishments in Arunachal Pradesh